Melissa Donà (born 11 April 1982 in Treviso) is an Italian professional volleyball player, playing as a hitter. She now plays for Volley Soverato.

References

1982 births
Living people
Sportspeople from the Province of Treviso
Italian women's volleyball players
21st-century Italian women